Lollipop F (Mandarin name 棒棒堂, Japanese name ロリポップF, Korean name 롤리팝 F) was a Taiwanese Mandopop boy band gaining popularity throughout Asia. The group started off with six members, all chosen from Channel [V] Taiwan's show 模范棒棒堂 (Bang Bang Tang, or BBT), a show which sought to create new male artistes in the entertainment business of Taiwan.

Towards the end of 2009, it was announced that the group has split up, with members Liljay and Wang Zi leaving the group.
In October 2010, the rest of the members, Owodog, A-Wei, Fabien and William, were regrouped to form Lollipop F, with 'F' representing "four", the number of members in their group, as well as their belief in continuing the Lollipop spirit "forever".

Lollipop signed with EMI Music Taiwan on December 2, 2006 and released their first EP in January 2007. With Gold Label Records' acquisition of EMI Music Taiwan, Lollipop was signed under the label Gold Typhoon until 2013 when the group had a contractual dispute with the label. They then went on and signed with A Entertainment and Seed Music. But after a year, they disbanded in 2017.

Career

2006 to 2009: Debut as Lollipop

Background & Formation (2006–2007)
Before entering the show Bang Bang Tanga, Owodog and A-Wei were previous members of ºmommy breakdance group Brick Angle Crew.

In 2006, Owodog and Fabien were among the first group of boys to be selected into BBT through recommendations and auditions held across Taiwan, the processes of which were broadcast in the show's first three episodes.
They were among the first 20 members of the showed whiched officially debuted on Augusted 17, 2006.
William and A-Wei made their first appearances on BBT on the October 13, 2006 episode where their auditions during the new selection round were aired. They were then selected to become members of the show.

On November 27, 2006, the episode in which the six members of the group were selected and revealed was aired. Notably, William and A-Wei's inclusion in the group was determined only moments before the announcements were filmed. The members signed a contract to Channel V, and Dora Ao became their artiste manager. The group, named Lollipop, then officially signed a contract with EMI Music Taiwan) on December 2, 2006. Owodog, being the leader in BBT, was appointed as the group leader as well. On December 9, 2006, Lollipop made its first public performance as a group at the V-Power Music Storm Concert.

2007 to 2008: Colorful Lollipop, Acting debut

Lollipop debut EP Colorful Lollipop was released on January 26, 2007, with six different covers, each featuring a member of the group. Four months later, on May 25, a second EP titled Summer's First Experience was released along with a photobook with compilation of photos taken in Okinawa, as well as a DVD. Lyrics for the song Summer's First Experience was written by Liljay and Prince.

During the summer of 2007, members of Lollipop made their acting debut in Taiwanese idol drama Brown Sugar Macchiato, a collaboration with girl group Hey Girl. Because of the large number of fifteen main characters and the many commitments both groups had apart from the drama, the original director quit after directing five episodes. Nevertheless, the first episode was aired in Taiwan on July 15, 2007. Later, Lollipop expressed on Taiwanese variety show Kangxi Lai Le that the drama had been more of an introduction of the two groups instead of a major acting challenge, as the members were told to act as their original selves, and that many subplots were explained only briefly due to the large number of main characters. After thirteen episodes, the drama ended on October 7, 2007. Additionally, an official soundtrack was released with songs by Lollipop and Hey Girl.

The same year, Lollipop began hosting their own show Lollipop Gyashan (LOLLIPOP哪裡怕) on October 27 until April 19, 2008, when the show stopped airing.

Their debut album Gyashan was released on December 28, 2007.  Gyashan took down the first position in the Mandarin charts, outselling F4's album Waiting for You – Await Your Love (在這裡等你) which was released on the same day. Liljay contributed lyrics to three out of ten songs, co-writing one with Fabien. A solo by Fabien, who composed both the music and lyrics, was recorded as well.

On January 26, 2008, a year after the release of their first EP, the group held its debut concert at the Taipei Arena. The concert DVD was released on June 6, 2008, breaking chart records with sales rates of more than 35%. The DVD topped the charts for a period of one month after its release.

2008 to 2009: Beyond Bang Bang Tang and solo projects
Lollipop had been appearing regularly on Bang Bang Tang  since August 14, 2006. With Channel [V]'s decision to select a new batch of boys and create a second season, Lollipop and most of the other members "graduated" from Bang Bang Tang after their last performances as members of the show. Their last official episode aired on August 29, 2008, marking the end of the first season. In total, the members of Lollipop had participated in more than 500 episodes of the show. Since the start of Bang Bang Tang II, Lollipop had, on several occasions, returned to the show as guests or co-hosts.

Drama and hosting opportunities
In May, earlier the same year,  A-Wei, Prince, and Fabien, part of the main cast, began shooting Lollipop's the second drama with members of Hey Girl and Bang Bang Tang. The drama, titled The Legend of Brown Sugar Chivalries, is a wuxia action drama set in modern times, which required the actors and actresses to learn and perform kungfu, as well as the use of weapons. Additionally, wire fu and special effects were used upon the cast for qinggong and some fighting scenes. The first episode was released on July 26, 2008 on Star TV Chinese Channel and had continued to air after the end of the first season of Bang Bang Tang. Later, Owodog guest starred in the drama, while Liljay and William had minor roles. The thirteenth and the last episode was aired on October 18, 2008, while the behind-the-scene footage was aired on October 25, 2008.

On October 3, 2008, the original soundtrack for The Legend of Brown Sugar Chivalries was released by Gold Typhoon, the songs of which includes lyric compositions by Liljay and Prince. A song involving collaboration with three members of Hey Girl was recorded, while Prince and Fabien both had a solo each. Two editions were released for the soundtrack album, one being a 10,000 limited edition.

After leaving Bang Bang Tang, William hosted a variety show called Wu Di Qing Chun Ke (無敵青春克) with Taiwanese singer Kenji Wu. The show finale was aired on November 5, 2008. On the other hand, Owodog, A-Wei, and Liljay began hosting Na Li Wu Da Kang (哪裡5打坑) with Hey Girl's Apple and Channel V's VJ Rong Jia. The show has since ended.

Film and other performing opportunities
One week after performing in Singapore, the group returned to Taiwan to participate in the 2008 V-Power Love Music Concert on November 29, 2008. The concert united Liljay, Owodog, and A-wei with other Black Angle Crew members for a dance performance, while Prince and Fabien performed their solos from the last soundtrack. Together, the six members performed five songs, including a remixed version of "You Make Me a Fool," Fabien's composition for the debut album. Lollipop's participation in the concert also marks, symbolically, the two-year anniversary of the group's formation.

A week later, on December 6, 2008, Lollipop performed four songs with themes of wushu at the 45th Golden Horse Awards ceremony.

After talks with Paco Wong in 2008, the chairman of Gold Records, Owodog was confirmed to be starring in a kungfu film called Hot-blooded Union (熱血同盟) with Theresa Fu and a member of The Flowers. The film has started filming near the end of 2008 in Beijing. Later, news also reveal that A-Wei, who impressed the director with his wushu skills, has been invited to guest star in the film. The name of the film has since been changed to Martial Spirit (武動青春), and a trailer was shown at Lollipop's I am Legend concert in Hong Kong.

Prince and members of Choc7 took part in the film L-O-V-E (愛到底 L-O-V-E), which consists of four short films directed by four different directors. The film was released on March 6, 2009.

As one of Channel [V]'s Chinese New Year programs, a short film called 狼牙棒 aired on January 26, 2009. The short film was produced by Owodog, William, and A-Wei, who starred in the film themselves.

In February, 2009, Channel [V] began filming its revamped version and new season of Bang Bang Tang, which marked the return of several members from the first season, including Lollipop. For the new season, Owodog shot and directed a promotional advertisement of members dancing at several sites in Taipei with Aben of Choc7. Bang Bang Tang III began airing on March 2, 2009, with Show Lo being the first guest star.
In 2009, Lollipop made its first lyric contributions to other artistes, which was included in the mini album of the group Choc7, composed of seven members selected from the same show.

2009: I am Legend: Second album and Asia tour
Lollipop's second album I am Legend was released on June 19, 2009. Nine out of the ten songs in the album included lyric contributions by Liljay, Owodog, Prince, and William and music compositions by Fabien and Prince for two songs. Solo performances by Liljay, Fabien, and William were recorded as well. A concert tour in Asia with the same name as the album commenced in Hong Kong Coliseum on July 4 and 5, 2009.

While promoting I am Legend on several Taiwanese variety shows, including Kangxi Lai Le, 100% Entertainment, Azio Superstar, etc., Lollipop created a series of dance performances specifically for the show hosts of each show, thus completing a mini TV performance tour.

With show host Christine Fan leaving the show to focus on her musical career, Bang Bang Tang'''s last episode was aired on July 30, 2009. The original time slot on Channel [V] has since been filled with a new show called Welcome外星人 that premiered on July 20, 2009, which was hosted by A-wei and William, along with Kevin Tsai. Prince was then given the opportunity to be part of the cast in a film called 精舞門2. Another short film directed and shot by A-wei called The Great Escape (廖問之越V風雲), starring Liljay, William, and members of Choc7 and Hey Girl, aired on Channel [V] on September 12, 2009.

2010 to 2011: Comeback as Lollipop F
To start off with a new image, Owodog, Fabien, William, and A-wei underwent an extensive 200-day training under the company's arrangement to improve their performing abilities.
On October 21, 2010, a news conference was held to announce the regrouping of the members to form "Lollipop F". Following the conference, Lollipop F's debut album Four Dimensions (四度空間) was released on November 6, 2010, featuring several songs of their own compositions, including the title track composed by Owodog and Fabien. Lollipop F was also appointed as Jeju Island's Taiwan Tourist Ambassadors by the Jeju Island Tourism Bureau, South Korea. The MVs for two songs in Four Dimensions were filmed at Jeju Island.

On January 13, 2011, Lollipop F held a press conference for the release of their tourism photobook, LOLLIPOP F Xi You Ji (棒棒堂嘻遊濟), announcing good results of the photobook sales exceeding 10,000 after 11 days of pre-ordering. The Four Dimensions (四度空間) album also accumulated sales of 160,000 copies globally.

Awards received for Four Dimensions (四度空間) G-Music 2010 Mandarin Music Charts 14th and Combined Music Charts 15th
 14th position on Mandarin Music Charts of Taiwan's five main album stores
 2010 IFPI Hong Kong Album Sales Award – Top Ten Best-Selling Mandarin Albums

2011 to 2013: Expansion, Dance and Jade Solid Gold Best Ten Music Awards
In the summer of 2011, Lollipop F trained in South Korea for the group's upcoming album and was subsequently invited to participate in Korean TV station SBS's hit variety show Star King, singing and dancing alongside Super Junior. It was unprecedented in Taiwan's entertainment history for a Taiwan group's appearance in a South Korean show, and the experience gave the recently reformed group a major boost in their confidence and popularity. Owodog then starred in popular Taiwanese film, You Are the Apple of My Eye (那些年，我們一起追的女孩) as extended cast.

Nearly a year after their debut album, Lollipop F released their second album Dance on October 20, 2011. As the main attraction of the album, the electronic/hip-hop title track, DANCE電司 features funky dance moves choreographed by Hamasaki Ayumi, Koda Kumi, and SMAP's dance teacher Sasaki Ko.

In March 2012, Lollipop F's leader, Owodog, participated in mainland China's reality TV dance competition, Let's Shake It (舞林大会) and fellow group members supported him as dancers for his performances. In the preliminary round recorded on March 1, 2012, Lollipop F's performance was awarded the highest score of 39.9 out of 40 by the four judges. The judges were impressed by their strong bonding as a group, their dance moves of high difficulty and their unique style of performance. Lollipop F then entered the finals after achieving another high score of 49.7 out of 50 in the semi-final round on April 24, 2012. In the finals, Lollipop F achieved a score of 68.7 out of 80 with the most creative performance in the history of the competition, eventually obtaining the second runner's up position and the highest popularity award.

On January 13, 2013, the group won the Asia Pacific Most Popular Male Singer award and the silver award for the Most Popular Chinese Song Awards category at the 2012 Jade Solid Gold Best Ten Music Awards Presentation.

2013 to 2017: New label, Comeback with Big Shot, disbandment
In June 2013, it was reported that the group had contractual disputes with their label, Gold Typhoon, as the company is unwilling to terminate their contract and not providing adequate work opportunities to the members. Gold Typhoon denied having contract disputes with Lollipop-F and claimed that talks are in progress regarding the group's new album.

On July 20, 2013, the group ended their contract with Gold Typhoon and signed on to Hong Kong celebrity, Eric Tsang's company, A Entertainment. They attended the Asia-Pacific Film Festival as guest performers held in Macao after signing with their new agency.

After signing with their new label and management company, the group was preparing to release their new single in 2014. They filmed the music video for their new song in Paris, which costs NT$2 million to produce. In March 2014, the group released their first single in three years, How (怎么了). In June, 2014, the group released their fourth EP, Big Shot, under Seed Music.

Overseas expansion

Hong Kong and Mainland China
Lollipop
Lollipop visited Hong Kong to promote their television soundtrack Brown Sugar Macchiato on September 26, 2007.
This was their first overseas promotional activity ever since their debut, and a huge fan turnout caused a great commotion at the shopping mall where they were having their meet-and-greet session.
Lollipop returned to Hong Kong on Christmas to promote their debut album. On February 1, 2008 they traveled Hong Kong for the third time to guest star in the Cantonese movie Truth or Dare: 6th Floor Rear Flat 2, and on the 23rd of the same month, performed at Show Lo's concert as guests. On June 1, 2008, the group also participated in a fundraising concert for the Sichuan earthquake. Since then, Lollipop has made several visits to Hong Kong for different purposes, including autograph sessions, award ceremonies, as well as an end-of-the-year countdown. In 2009, Lollipop visited Hong Kong to promote its Asia tour, which commences in Hong Kong.

Lollipop visited Mainland China on March 23, 2008, to promote their debut album. With over 3000 fans, the autograph session was canceled due to safety reasons, as the situation grew out of control. Thus, fans were able to catch only a few glimpses of the group. Nevertheless, Lollipop stayed at the venue and finished signing each album in a separate room. Later the same year, from December 18 to 26, Lollipop made visits to several cities, including Wuhan, Shanghai, Beijing, Guangzhou, and Shenzhen, to promote the soundtrack for The Legend of Brown Sugar Chivalries.

Lollipop F
In 2011 to 2012, Lollipop F has visited various places in mainland China and Hong Kong to promote the Four Dimension and Dance albums.

Singapore and Malaysia
Lollipop
Lollipop traveled to Singapore on June 12, 2008, to promote their concert DVD. There was an autograph session held at a bar in Clarke Quay; thus, the organisers had to give out tickets to limit the number of fans entering. 
Later the same year, on November 22, Lollipop made another visit to Singapore to promote the official soundtrack of The Legend of Brown Sugar Chivalries, performing several songs at the Music Monster Festival, which also featured Taiwanese group Energy. The next day, an autograph session was held at IMM, which attracted more than 3000 fans.

The group visited Malaysia for the first time on June 5, 2009. They were invited to be performing guests during the finals of the television show Ultimate Power Group the next day.

Lollipop F
Lollipop F visited Singapore in both 2011 and 2012 to hold autograph sessions for both Four Dimensions and Dance albums respectively. They also had a live performance at the televised Sheng Siong Show (缤纷万千在升菘) on February 4, 2012.

On 16 June 2012, Lollipop F performed at Hennessy Artistry Penang, Malaysia.

South Korea
Lollipop F
In the summer of 2011, Lollipop F was invited to take part in Korean TV station SBS's hit variety show Star King, singing and dancing alongside Super Junior.

Australia (Sydney & Melbourne)
Lollipop F
On March 30 and 31, 2012, Lollipop F held two mini concerts in Sydney and Melbourne respectively.

Members

DiscographyFor complete Lollipop Discography (2006–2009) prior to Lollipop F and JPM, see also: Lollipop DiscographyStudio

EPs

Soundtracks

Concert DVD

TV Shows Hosting

Filmography

TV series

Films

Short films
This table includes short films that are directed and produced by members of Lollipop, which were aired on Channel [V] independently (i.e. not as part of the show Bang Bang Tang).

Concert appearancesThis list does not include year-end galas or autograph/performance sessions.Own concerts

Guest appearances

Other concertsThis table consists of concerts where Lollipop is one of many artists who performed.''

Awards

Lollipop (2006–2009)

Lollipop F

References

External links

  Lollipop F official website and fan club lollipopf.net
 Lollipop F on GoldTyphoon.com
  Lollipop F@Gold Typhoon
  Lollipop F official Facebook page
 
 
 
 
 
 

Musical groups established in 2006
Taiwanese boy bands
Mandopop musical groups